Shahrak-e Shahid Beheshti (also Romanized as Shahrak-e Shahīd Beheshtī) is a village in Derak Rural District, in the Central District of Shiraz County, Fars Province, Iran. At the 2006 census, its population was 6,428, in 1,737 families.

References 

Populated places in Shiraz County